Hipódromo Chile is a thoroughbred horse race track in the municipality of Independencia, in the  Santiago Metropolitan Region of Chile. It is one of two race tracks in Greater Santiago.

History 
The track was founded in 1904 by a group of 19 owners, breeders and supporters. It is one of Chile's three main tracks, the others being Club Hipico de Santiago and Valparaiso Sporting Club.

Physical attributes 

Hipodromo Chile features a roughly triangular left-handed dirt track of slightly more than 1 mile (exactly 1.645m). Of the three main race tracks in Chile, it is the only one that does not have a turf track.

Racing 
Live racing is conducted every Saturday and most Thursdays. As usual for Chile's major tracks, 18 to 20 races on a single raceday are common.

2007 Major Stakes schedule

External links
 Home Page
 Racecourse Profile on Horse Racing South America

Horse racing venues in Chile
Sports venues in Santiago